Naresh Aula (5 May 1986 – 10 June 2020) was an Indian footballer who played professionally as a midfielder. He spent the majority of his career playing with ONGC, playing a season as a professional in the I-League during the 2012–13 season. He had also represented Maharashtra and Odisha in the Santosh Trophy.

Career statistics

References

1986 births
2020 deaths
People from Odisha
 Indian footballers
Association football midfielders
ONGC FC players
I-League players
Footballers from Odisha
Maharashtra football team players